Yvona Brzáková (born 23 April 1956) is a former professional tennis player who competed for Czechoslovakia.

Biography
Brzáková was born in Levoča, then a town in Czechoslovakia but now part of Slovakia. She won a doubles silver medal at the 1977 Summer Universiade, with Renáta Tomanová as her partner.

A right-handed player, Brzáková appeared in the doubles of two Federation Cup ties for Czechoslovakia in the early rounds of the 1980 World Group, winning both matches, against Hungarian and Yugoslavian pairings. The Czechoslovak team made it through to the semi-finals, but Brzáková didn't feature.

During the 1980s she played professionally on the WTA Tour and won one title, partnering Kateřina Skronská in the doubles at the Austrian Open Kitzbühel in 1982. Her best grand slam performances was a third round appearance in the singles at the 1983 French Open, where she beat Pilar Vásquez and Renee Blount to make the final 32.

After retiring from the WTA Tour, Brzáková played and coached in Germany in the 1990s. She has since coached in Prague.

WTA Tour finals

Doubles (1–0)

References

External links
 
 
 

1956 births
Living people
Czechoslovak female tennis players
People from Levoča
Sportspeople from the Prešov Region
Universiade medalists in tennis
Universiade silver medalists for Czechoslovakia
Medalists at the 1977 Summer Universiade